Bill Taft is an American rock musician living in Atlanta, Georgia.

Biography
Taft is the son of former Ohio state Senator William W. Taft, and a distant cousin of former United States President William Howard Taft.
In 1982, Taft moved from Ohio to Atlanta to attend Emory University. His first band of note was The Chowder Shouters, whose instruments included garbage cans. They released a six-song vinyl record.
After the demise of the Chowder Shouters, Taft joined The Opal Foxx Quartet, a group consisting of anywhere from 2 to 14 members at a time.  They broke up in 1992 after the deaths of several members. They released a posthumous CD, which was largely produced by Michael Stipe.

Around 1988, Taft started An Evening with the Garbageman, a spoken-word open-mic variety show, which he hosted and that eventually morphed into The Jody Grind. The Jody Grind released two CDs before disbanding following the deaths of half their members. Drummer Robert Clayton and bassist Robert Hayes died in a horrific traffic accident which also claimed the life of performer Deacon Lunchbox. The accident occurred as the band was returning to Atlanta after performing in Montgomery, AL.

After The Jody Grind broke up in 1992, Taft formed Kick Me, with Allen Page (of Opal Foxx Quartet) and Kelly Hogan (of The Jody Grind). They recorded several songs that eventually came out on a compilation album called Hidden Tracks, released by Daemon Records. 
Kick Me broke up after Allen Page died of a drug overdose.
. 
Smoke recorded two full-length CDs and several compilation tracks, playing until 1999 when lead singer Benjamin died of hepatitis C. 
A year after Benjamin died, Taft started Hubcap City. He has also started Another Evening with the Garbageman, an open-mic spoken word project similar to An Evening with the Garbageman.

Around 2017, Taft, along with Brian Halloran (cello) and Will Fratesi (drums) (of Smoke) started the band W8ing4UFOs. They released the album "Don't Let the Asshats Burn You" during the Coronavirus Pandemic in the fall of 2020.

Bands and Instruments
Dr. Dixon and the Operators: guitar
Crawling Kingsnakes guitar and vocals
The Chowder Shouters: guitar and vocals
Opal Foxx Quartet: guitar
The Jody Grind: guitar and vocals
Kick Me: guitar, vocals
Smoke: vocals, cornet, banjo
Hubcap City: vocals, guitar, cornet, banjo
W8ing4UFOs: vocals, guitar, banjo

Discography

The Chowder Shouters
Chowder Shouters vinyl (1986)
 Weather Report
 Little Wing
 Amazing Grace
 Instrumental
 The Arkansas Side
 The Old Tar River
.

Opal Foxx Quartet
The Love That Won't Shut Up CD (1994, LongPlay Records)
 Clean White Bed
 Frail Body
 Blue Exception
 Sleep
 Tub of Love Rumble
 Nightingale
 MTM
 Christmas
 Dirt
 I Don't Know How to Love Him/Strange Fruit
 Aliens
Track 1 written by Tracy Snow.
Track 2 written by Grady Cousins.
Track 4 written by Debbey Richardson.
Track 5 is Deacon Lunchbox sleeping in the back of a truck.
Track 7 is The Mary Tyler Moore Show Theme Song, "Love is All Around."
Track 10 is a medley of the song from Jesus Christ Superstar and the Billie Holiday song.
Track 11 written and performed by Deacon Lunchbox.

The Jody Grind
One Man's Trash is Another Man's Treasure CD (1991, DB Records)
 Peter Gunn
 One Man's Trash (Is Another Man's Treasure)
 Eight-Ball
 Mood Indigo
 Death of Zorba
 Blue and Far
 Governor of Hong Kong
 Just Because You Wear Big Shoes
 It Ain't Necessarily So
 Love, Love Alone
 Wishin' and Hopin'
 My Darlin'
 Florida Maine
 I'm a Fool to Want You

Lefty's Deceiver CD (1992, Ichiban)
 3rd Of July
 Lounge Axe
 Funnel Of Love
 Friday
 Hands Of June
 Can't You See
 Promise Of Sleep
 Circle
 Driving At Night
 Superhero
 Rickie
 Carry You
 Blues For The Living

Smoke
Dirt 7" (1993, Colossal Records)
 Dirt
 Pretend
Heaven on a Popsicle Stick CD (1994, LongPlay Records)
 Hole
 Awake
 Freak (Winn's Song)
 The Trip
 Hank Aaron (lyrics by Dana Kletter)
 Luke's Feet
 Beeper Will
 The Pond
 I Do
 Ballet
 Guilt
 Abigail
 Curtains
Another Reason To Fast CD (1995, LongPlay Records)
 Trust
 Friends
 When It Rains
 Clean White Bed
 Shadow Box
 Dream
 Fatherland
 Train Song
 Debbey's Song
 Chad
 That Look
 I Don't
 Snake

Hubcap City
EP 1 CD (2001, Self-released)
 Day Job
 My Punk Ass
 Paul's Boot
 My Wasted Friends
 Weegee
Live: 2001-2002 CD (2002, H.I.G. Records 004)
 Action!
 Breakfast at Taxi Driver's
 The Man Who Never Forgets
 Hubcap City
 Paul's Boot
 Reservoir
 Some Things
 Stomp/Atomic Fireball
 Faulkner's Typewriter
 Debby
 Vital Pimp Flash
 Ready to Serve
 Rahab
 Jack Henry
 The Top of the Hill
 Sandbox
 Beautiful and Fucked Up
Tracks 1-8 recorded at WREK radio on 11/13/01.
Tracks 9 and 12 recorded outside at Railroad Earth Studios 5/19/01.
Track 10 recorded at Eyedrum 3/10/01.
Track 11 recorded 12/30/01 at The Earl.
Tracks 13-17 recorded 8/02/02 at Earthshaking Music.

EP 2 CD (2002, self-released)
 Reservoir
 Breakfast at Taxi Driver's
 Action
 Atomic Fireball
 Hubcap City

EP 3 CD (2004, self-released)
 Jack Henry
 Kiss Me, Arturo
 Left Eye Went the Wrong Way
 Sandbox
 Cat Hair on Rockabilly Dress
 Slug Party
 Door

More Songs For Dead Children CD (2004, self-released)
 Will's 4-Track
 Damaged
 Fried
 Hold On
 Slough of Despond
 Court
 Dumped
 Sassy Magazine Record Review #2: Dear Madonna
 One-Eyed Rapists Attack
 Unfinished Film Festival Song
 Beautiful and Fucked Up

 Super Local 13 CD (2005, self-released)
 Staircase
 Hurrah Hurrah
 U Don't Know Me Stomp
 Message Received 2:34 AM Thursday
 Guest of Honor
 Five Slugs More Party Minutes
 7 Zebra Heads 2 Plastic Skulls
 Yippie Yeah Yeah
 Message Received 2:51 AM Thursday
 Preacher
 Blackout
 Ham on Rye
 Snarl Baby Snarl
.

Hubcap City (from Belgium)

 Deerhunter/Hubcap City Split 7" (2006, Rob's House Records)
 Hubcap City - Mad House
 Deerhunter - Grayscale

 Five More Minutes b/w Sally 7" (2006, Ponce de Leon Records)
 Five More Minutes
 Sally

 Superlocalhellfreakride CD (2007, Xeric 112)
 Get Rid of Now	
 Unexpected Guest	
 Ring Around the Rosie	
 Wind Blowing on a Sick Man	
 Deer Hunting	
 Sticks in the Graveyard	
 Valley of Bones	
 No Return	
 When the President Sez	
 Bottle of Rum	
 He Brings the Hatchet in the Evening	
 Rahab	2:39	
 Boxcar Gamelan	
 Guy on Street	
 Hippest Trick		
 More Guy on Street	
 Arabella Sabotage	
 The Anti-Christ is Alive...
.

Compilation appearances

with Kelly Hogan
 The Mother of all Flagpole Christmas Albums CD (1992, Flagpole)
 Introduction - Deacon Lunchbox
 Santa's Hard - Follow for Now
 Thomas Tinsel's Holiday - Kevn Kinney
 Santa vs Magneto - Bliss
 Santa Baby - Michelle Malone
 Santa Claus - The Woggles
 Jingle Bells - Flat Duo Jets
 Learn to Love Again - Dreams So Real
 Papa's Home - Widespread Panic
 Here Comes Christmas - Daisy
 You're a Mean One Mr. Grinch - Labrea Stompers
 Santa Claus, Go Straight to the Ghetto - Seersucker
 Snowflakes Are Falling - Hear it Love it Dance it
 Christmas in August - BloodKin
 Just Think About Christmas (And Sing What You Want) - Five Eight
 O Magnum Mysterium - Kelly Hogan and Bill Taft
 No Vacancy - Marlee MacLeod
 On Christmas Day - Opal Foxx Quartet
 Candles and Miracles - Hetch Hetchy
 This Holiday Season - Porn Orchard
 Christmas With the Devil - Allgood
 White Christmas - Vic Chesnutt

Cake
Low Life 17 LP (1993, RRRecords)
Side a:
 Tinnitus - Seven Minutes or Less
 Cake (Tracy Snow) - Blue Moles
 Cake (Tracy Snow) - I Want to Sleep
 Freedom Puff - Visiting with the White Rock Girl
 Freedom Puff - 2 Dixie Cups and a String
Side b:
 Murray Reams & Paul Hoskin - The Dispossessed
 Murray Reams & Paul Hoskin - Submission
 I See the Moon - Somnambulist Waltz
 I See the Moon - Snellville
 Dairy Queen Empire - The World
 Dairy Queen Empire - Burning

NOTE: Bill played banjo for Cake on this record.

Solo
 The Soft-Spoken Beatnik Cousin of the Flagpole Christmas Albums cassette (1994, LongPlay Records)
Side 1
 Gayle Danley - Just Like the Girl on Channel 17
 Chris Chandler - Just Say No But Spell it with a K
 Hillary Meister - Latkes at Chanukkah in America
 Gwen O Looney - Meditations for Women who Do Too Much
 Randy Blazak - Jump Around Santa
 Charlie Ginste - Flockogank
 Mudcat - Rudoplh's Party
 Copacetic Chris - A Holiday Poem
 David Oats - Shopping Prayer
 David Greenberger - Let Women Chase Me
 Blondie - The 12 Days of Christmas
 Murray Attaway - Up on the Housetop
 Sheila Doyle - Christmas Island
Side 2
 Deadbeat Burt - Rudolph the Red Eyed Reindeer
 Douglas A. Martin - Undercover Empty Moon Gazing
 A.E. Stallings - A Winter Nursery Rhyme
 Vic Varney - True North
 Ripley - I Drank with the Devil
 R. Tod Smith - Christmas at Charter
 David Greenberger - Quincy Sore Throat
 Julie Thrasher - Cowboy Dreams
 Richard Fausset w/Neutral Platypus Uncollective - Under the Breath of The Salvation Army Santa
 Scott Royal - Joke
 Emory Laughing Wolf - Merry Grimace
 Todd Mortensen - Autumn's Prayer, Winter's Touch
 Bear Step and Joe Brennan - Bear and Joe's Wish List
 Bill Taft - Happy Birthday Baby Jesus

Smoke
 ? CD (1992)
 Smoke - Dog
The lineup on this song was Benjamin, Bill Taft, Brian Halloran, and Todd Butler. This CD was a benefit compilation.

 Radio Oddyssey Volume 2: The Georgia Music Show CD (1997 Altered Records/Ichiban)
 The Rock*A*Teens - Black Ice
 The Continentals - Please, Please
 Pineal Ventana - Dark Cloud
 DQE - Mermaid And The Sailor
 #1 Family Mover - Hey Soul
 Bob - Ants
 Velvet Overkill Five - Pillow Talk
 The Goodies - Live On WRAS-FM
 Tweezer - Sucking Midgets
 Marcy - Driver
 Heinous Bienfang - Stay Behind The Cones
 Babyfat - Redd Lobster
 Frontstreet - Scandinavian Pamphlet (Sex Book)
 17 Years - Doing Wrong
 Smoke - Hamlet
 Benjamin - Big Daddy Story and Other Saucy Tales
 
 Rudy's Rockin' Kiddie Caravan CD (1997 Bloodshot Records)
 Susie Honeyman - Bus
 Schoolly D - This Old Man
 Smoke - Old Joe Clark
 Calexico - The Man on the Flying Trapeze
 The Waco Brothers - Them Bones
 Giant Sand - Blow the Man Down
 Anne Richmond Boston - What Can the Matter Be?
 D. L. Menard & the Louisiana Aces - J'ai Passe Devant Ta Porte?
 Zydeco Elvis - The ABC Song
 Sally Timms - Hush Little Baby
 New Orleans Klezmer All Stars - Nokas for the Kinder
 The Chiselers - Playmate
 The Rock*A*Teens - She'll Be Coming 'Round the Mountain
 Moonshine Willy - Skip to My Lou
 Kelly Hogan - The Great Titanic
 The Black Mama Dharma Band - A Frozen Road
 Mekons - Oranges & Lemons
 New Kingdom - John Henry
 Rob Gal - Twinkle Twinkle Little Star
 Blacktop Rockets - Froggy Went A-Courtin'
 Vic Chesnutt - Home on the Range
 The Grifters - The Muffin Man

 Hidden Tracks CD (2000, Daemon Records)

 Kick Me - Arms
 Smoke - Midnight
 DQE - Ivytwine
 Parlour - The Cold Snap
 Kick Me - Black Coat
 Kick Me - Blue Midnight
 Parlour - Baby Doll
 Bill Taft & Neil Fried - Old West
 Smoke - Pretend
 Palookaville - Seventh Day
 Long Flat Red - Eighty-Six Days
 Railroad Earth - Keep Seeing That Soul
 Kick Me - Lucky Nights
 The Hollidays - Miles Away

Guest appearances
Indigo Girls - Shaming of the Sun CD (1997, Daemon Records)
12. Hey Kind Friend
Taft played cornet on this song, written about his friend Benjamin.

The Rock*A*Teens - The Rock*A*Teens (January 23, 1996)
13. Arm in Arm in the Golden Twilight We Loitered On
Taft played cornet on this track.

Greg Connors - Full Moon Flashlight CD (2009, Scared Records)
4. Two Women and A Flood (Sweet Distraction) 
9. September Baby, a cover of a song written by Joseph Arthur
Taft played cornet on both these tracks.

Adventure Time "Blue Magic", 
written by Jack Pendarvis, sung by Kelly Hogan, with guitar performance by Bill Taft.

References

See also
Smoke
Hubcap City
Sweet Pea interview with Bill Taft

1964 births
Taft family
Living people
American male singers
Musicians from Shaker Heights, Ohio
Daemon Records artists
Date of birth missing (living people)